Olinda is a town within the Dandenong Ranges in central-south Victoria, Australia, located  east of Melbourne's CBD, located within the Shire of Yarra Ranges local government area. Olinda recorded a population of 1,773 at the 2021 census.

It is a popular weekend destination for tourists, with a variety of restaurants and cafes.  The town is home to the Dandenong Ranges Botanic Garden and R.J. Hamer Arboretum.

History
Olinda is named after Olinda Creek, which begins in the township. The creek was named in 1858 after Alice Olinda Hodgkinson, the daughter of Clement Hodgkinson, Victoria's acting Surveyor General. The town was initially a logging settlement, however as land was made available for horticulture in the early 1900s, the town began to grow substantially. The Post Office opened on 21 August 1901. Berry farming, dairying, and flower growing became prosperous industries, and tourism soon flourished as the principal industry of Olinda.

In 1919 the Australian artist Sir Arthur Streeton returned to Australia and built a house on the property called Longacres, in Olinda. Guesthouses and weekend homes became a common staple for the area, allowing for the township to enter a prosperous period of guest house tourism. The popularity of guesthouses and weekend cottages in the town lasted until World War II. After which, the rise of motor vehicle transportation saw a decline in weekend trips, and a rise in day trips by motor vehicle. In 1966 the Ashendene Boys Home was located in Olinda, until its closure in 1988.

In 1952 Olinda hosted the Olinda Film Festival (also called the Melbourne Film Festival and the convention of Australian Council of Film Societies).

The Olinda Golf Club was established in 1952, and operated for 60 years before it was closed in 2012. In 2017, the Victorian Government announced that the site of the former golf club would be converted into parklands and gardens, along with the expansion of the rhododendron gardens into the new Dandenong Ranges Botanic Gardens.

Demographics
The median age of the Olinda population was 44 years of age, compared to the Australian average of 38.  
74.9% of residents were born in Australia, compared to the Australian average of 66.7%. The other top responses for country of birth were England 7.2% and New Zealand 1.7%. 
When asked about religion, the most frequent response was "No Religion" (50%), followed by Catholic (12%), and Anglican (10%).

Economy
Olinda is a popular tourist destination in the Dandenong Ranges, home to cafes, restaurants, antique and craft shops, and numerous art galleries, showcasing local, national, and international artists in such areas as sculpture and painting. The town is surrounded by a number of walking trails and natural waterfalls, including the Olinda Falls & Cascade Walk. The Dandenong Ranges Botanic Garden is situated to the east of the town.

Sport
Together with the neighbouring township of Ferny Creek, Olinda has both Australian Rules football and netball teams competing in the Outer East Football and Netball League.

Media
Olinda receives all Melbourne TV and Radio Channels, as it is very close to the Transmission towers, which are West of Olinda. However, being near the Transmitters and in the hills, Olinda also receives channels from Gippsland, and some from Bendigo.
TV operators are ABC, SBS, Seven Network (Melbourne), Nine Network (Melbourne), Ten Network (Melbourne), Southern Cross Nine (Gippsland and Bendigo), Prime7 (Gippsland and Bendigo), WIN Network (Gippsland and Bendigo), 7TWO (Melbourne, Gippsland, Bendigo), 7mate (Melbourne, Gippsland, Bendigo).

References

External links
Olinda - Government tourism site

Suburbs of Melbourne
Suburbs of Yarra Ranges
Logging communities
Logging in Australia